William Jack is the name of:

William Jack (athlete) (born 1930), British Olympic sprinter 
William Jack (Australian explorer) (died 1910), founder of Herberton, Queensland
William Jack (Australian politician) (1892–1982)
William Jack (botanist) (1795–1822), of Scotland
William Jack (mathematician) (1834–1924), from Scotland
William Jack (U.S. politician) (1788–1852), member of the U.S. House of Representatives 
William Brydone Jack (1817–1886), Canadian mathematician and astronomer
William Houston Jack (1806–1844), Republic of Texas congressman and soldier